Nigeria competed at the 1972 Summer Olympics in Munich, West Germany.

Medalists

Bronze
Isaac Ikhouria — Boxing, Men's Light Heavyweight

Results by event

Athletics
Men's 100 metres
Benedict Majekodumni
 First Heat — 10.70s (→ did not advance)

Men's 800 metres
Jaiye Abidoye
 Heat — 1:52.0 (→ did not advance)

Men's 1500 metres
Jaiye Abidoye
 Heat — 3:48.8 (→ did not advance)

Men's 4 × 100 m Relay
Kola Abdulai, Rux Bazunu, James Olakunle, and Timon Oyebami
 Heat — 39.66s 
 Semifinals — 39.73s (→ did not advance)

Women's 4 × 100 m Relay
Emilie Edet, Ashanti Obi, Helen Olaye, and Modupe Oshikoya
 Heat — 45.15s (→ did not advance, 12th place)

Women's Long Jump
Modupe Oshikoya
 Qualifying Round — 6.22m (→ did not advance, 19th place)

Women's Pentathlon
Modupe Oshikoya
 First Heat — 4.279 points (→ 14th place)

Boxing
Men's Heavyweight (+ 81 kg)
Fatai Ayinla
 First Round — Lost to Carroll Morgan (CAN), 2:3

References
Official Olympic Reports
International Olympic Committee results database

Nations at the 1972 Summer Olympics
1972 in Nigerian sport